The ghost pepper, also known as bhut jolokia ( in Assamese), is an interspecific hybrid chili pepper cultivated in Northeast India. It is a hybrid of Capsicum chinense and Capsicum frutescens.

In 2007, Guinness World Records certified that the ghost pepper was the world's hottest chili pepper, 170 times hotter than Tabasco sauce. The ghost chili is rated at more than one million Scoville Heat Units (SHUs). However, in the race to grow the hottest chili pepper, the ghost chili was superseded by the Trinidad Scorpion Butch T pepper in 2011 and the Carolina Reaper in 2013.

Etymology and regional names

The name bhüt jolokia (ভোট জলকীয়া) means 'Bhutanese pepper' in Assamese; the first element bhüt, meaning 'Bhutan', was mistakenly confused for a near-homonym bhut meaning 'ghost'.

In Assam, the pepper is also known as bih zôlôkia ('poison chili'), from Assamese bih 'poison' and zôlôkia 'chili pepper,' denoting the plant's heat.

Similarly, in Nagaland, one of the regions of cultivation, the chili is called Naga jolokia ('Naga chili'; also romanized nôga zôlôkia) and bhut jolokia (also romanized bhût zôlôkiya). This name is especially common in other regions where it is grown, such as Assam and Manipur. Other usages on the subcontinent are saga jolokia, 'Indian mystery chili' and 'Indian rough chili'.

It has also been called the Tezpur chili after the Assamese city of Tezpur. In Manipur, the chili is called umorok or oo-morok ('tree chili').

In northeastern India, the bhut jolokia is also known as the "king chilli" or "king cobra chilli'".

Scoville rating

In 2000, India's Defence Research Laboratory (DRL) reported a Scoville rating for the ghost pepper of 855,000 SHUs, and in 2004 a rating of 1,041,427 SHUs was made using HPLC analysis. For comparison, Tabasco red pepper sauce rates at 2,500–5,000, and pure capsaicin (the chemical responsible for the pungency of pepper plants) rates at 16,000,000 SHUs. In 2005, New Mexico State University's Chile Pepper Institute in Las Cruces, New Mexico found ghost peppers grown from seed in southern New Mexico to have a Scoville rating of 1,001,304 SHUs by HPLC. Unlike most peppers, ghost peppers produce capsaicin in vesicles not only in the placenta around the seeds but also throughout the fruit.

Characteristics
The unselected strain of ghost peppers from India is an extremely variable plant, with a wide range in fruit sizes and fruit production per plant. Ghost pepper pods are unique among peppers because of their characteristic shape and very thin skin. However, the red fruit variety has two different types: the rough, dented fruit and the smooth fruit. The rough fruit plants are taller, with more fragile branches, while the smooth fruit plants yield more fruit and are compact with sturdier branches. It takes about 7–12 days to germinate at 32–38 °C.

Uses

Ghost peppers are used as a food and a spice. It is used in both fresh and dried forms to "heat up" curries, pickles and chutneys. It is popularly used in combination with pork or dried or fermented fish. In northeastern India, the peppers are smeared on fences or incorporated in smoke bombs as a safety precaution to keep wild elephants at a distance. The pepper's intense heat makes it a fixture in competitive chili-pepper eating.

Chili grenades

In 2009, scientists at India's Defence Research and Development Organisation (DRDO) announced plans to use the peppers in hand grenades as a nonlethal method to control rioters with pepper sprays or in self-defence. The DRDO said that ghost pepper-based aerosol sprays could be used as a "safety device", and "civil variants" of chili grenades could be used to control and disperse mobs. Chili grenades made from ghost peppers were successfully used by the Indian Army in August 2015 to flush out a terrorist hiding in a cave.

Gallery

See also
 List of Capsicum cultivars

References

Capsicum cultivars
Chili peppers
Medicinal plants of Asia
Flora of Assam (region)
Geographical indications in Nagaland